Mangalore Today is a newspaper published in Mangalore, Karnataka, India.

References

External links
Official site

Newspapers published in Karnataka
Mass media in Mangalore
Publications with year of establishment missing